The 1N400x (or 1N4001 or 1N4000) series is a family of popular one-ampere general-purpose silicon rectifier diodes commonly used in AC adapters for common household appliances.  Its blocking voltage varies from 50 volts (1N4001) to 1000 volts (1N4007).  This JEDEC device number series is available in the DO-41 axial package.  Diodes with similar ratings are available in SMA and MELF surface mount packages (in other part number series).

The 1N540x (or 1N5400) series is a similarly popular family of diodes rated 3 Amperes. These diodes use the larger DO-201AD axial package to dissipate heat better.

History
The 1N400x series was originally introduced by Motorola's Semiconductor Products Division and registered at JEDEC in 1963 as silicon power rectifiers used primarily for military and industrial applications. It appeared in the Motorola Semiconductor Data Manual in 1965, as replacements for 1N2609 through 1N2617. The 1N540x series were announced in Electrical Design News in 1968, along with the now lesser-known 1.5 A 1N5391 series.

Overview
These devices are widely used and recommended for general-purpose power-frequency rectifier use. They are commonly used as rectifiers in AC adapters of electrical appliances to convert AC to DC, and are also used in other types of power converters, or as freewheeling diodes to protect circuits from inductive loads.

These are fairly low-speed rectifier diodes, being inefficient for square waves of more than 15 kHz.  They are not designed for switching applications; datasheets often don't specify any information on their turn-on and turn-off characteristics.

Compared with signal diodes, rectifier diodes generally have higher current ratings, can have much higher reverse voltage ratings, but have higher leakage current and  greater junction capacitance.

The following table lists part numbers in the 1N400x, 1N540x, and other popular general-purpose silicon rectifier diode families.

See also
 1N58xx Schottky diodes
 1N4148 signal diode
 Diode bridge
 Flyback diode

References

Further reading
 
Historical databooks
 Semiconductor Data Manual (1965, 916 pages), Motorola
 Diode Data Book (1978, 210 pages), Fairchild

External links

 Forward Bias Characteristics of 1N400x Family Diodes - Clifton Laboratories
 Diode Turn-on/off Time and Relay Snubbing - Clifton Laboratories

Diodes